Gemelli DiVersi is an Italian hip hop group, best known for their hit single "Mary".

Biography
Gemelli DiVersi formed in 1997 in Milan when two Italian rap crews, La Cricca and Rima Nel Cuore, merged. Their first single was 1998's "Un attimo ancora", rapped over a sample of Pooh's "Dammi solo un minuto". The song and the accompanying album were hits in Italy, and the group subsequently made an appearance in a Coca-Cola commercial. 4x4, their sophomore release, followed in 2000, and the group toured with Eros Ramazzotti.

In 2002, they returned with the album Fuego and the single "Mary", which became a massive hit in Italy, charting for eight months. In 2003, the group was named Best Italian Act at the MTV Europe Music Awards. They appeared at Live 8 in Italy in 2005 and starred in their own MTV Italy show called Pimp My Wheels, based on Pimp My Ride. In 2007 they released the album Boom! and in 2009 they released Senza Fine : Greatest Hits 98-09, featuring all their singles along with four new songs.

Members

Current members
Francesco Stranges (Strano) - vocals
Emanuele Busnaghi (Thema) - rapping

Past members
Luca Paolo Aleotti (Weedo) 
Alessandro Merli (THG)

Discography
Gemelli DiVersi (1998)
4x4 (2000)
Come piace a me (2001)
Fuego (2002)
Fuego Special Edition (2xCD) (2003)
Reality Show (2004)
Boom! (2007)
Senza fine '98 -'09 (2009; ITA: Gold)
Tutto da capo (2012)
Uppercut (2016)

References
[ Gemelli Diversi] at Allmusic

Italian hip hop groups
Hip hop groups from Milan
Musical groups from Milan
Italian rappers
MTV Europe Music Award winners